The 30th century BC was a century that lasted from the year 3000 BC to 2901 BC.

Events

 Before 3000 BC: An image of a deity (detail from a cong) recovered from Tomb 12 in Fanshan, Yuyao, Zhejiang, is made during the Neolithic period by the Liangzhu culture. It is now kept at Zhejiang Provincial Museum, Hangzhou.
c. 3000 BC - Earliest remains from Aniba (Nubia).
 c. 3000 BC: Early agriculture in North Africa.
 c. 3300 BC – 2600 BC: Early Harappan period continues in the Indus Valley.
 c. 3000 BC: Camels are domesticated in Egypt.
 c. 3000 BC: Stonehenge begins to be built. In its first version, it consists of a circular ditch and bank, with 56 wooden posts.
 c. 3000 BC: Cycladic civilization in the Aegean Sea starts.
 c. 3000 BC: Helladic period starts.
 c. 3000 BC: Aegean Bronze Age starts.
 c. 3000 BC: Austronesian expansion begins.
 c. 3000 BC: Jawa, Jordan is founded along with the world's first known dam.
 c. 2960 BC: Death of Egyptian First Dynasty pharaoh, Semerkhet, whose name marks the first definitive use of a Nebty name.
 c. 2920 BC: Troy is founded on this date (assuming the interpretation of Manfred Korfmann is followed).

Inventions, discoveries, introductions
 3000–2000 BC – Hieroglyphic writing in Egypt, potter's wheel in China, first pottery in the Americas (in Ecuador).
 c. 3000 BC – Sumerians establish cities.
 c. 3000 BC – Sumerians start to work in various metals.
 c. 3000 BC – Knowledge of Ancient Near Eastern grains appears in Ancient China.
 3000–2000 BC – Settled villages are widespread in Mesoamerica.
 The shekal was introduced in Mesopotamia as a monetary and weight unit; see ancient weights and measures, Shekel.
The Sydney rock engravings date from around 3000 BC (Sydney, Australia).

Architecture
30th century BC in architecture

References

 

 
-0
-70